The Southern Path is a 4.5km off-road shared path linking Takanini and Papakura. The route runs along State Highway 1. It opened in 2021 and was built part of the Southern Corridor Improvements project.

References 

Cycleways in Auckland
Papakura Local Board Area